Pius Fidelis Pinto (born 24 April 1960) is an Indian priest and research scholar of Christianity in Canara, India. He is noted for his research work and publications on the history of Konkani Christians of Canara. He has written eight books and presented 36 research papers at various events across the world.

Biography
Pius Fidelis Pinto was born on 24 April 1960 in Gurpur, eight miles north-east of Mangalore, to Frederick Pinto and Stella Pinto (née Lobo). His family is of Mangalorean Catholic descent. He joined the St. Joseph's Seminary in Mangalore in 1975. Pinto completed his Bachelor of Arts (B.A.) degree in 1981 from Mysore University, Master of Arts (M.A.) degree in 1983 from Karnatak University (Dharwad), and Bachelor of Theology (B.Th.) degree in 1986 from Pontifical Urbaniana University (Rome). He was ordained as a priest in 1986. Later, he completed his Doctor of Philosophy (PhD) degree in History in 1998 from Mysore University.

Pinto has done vast research both in India and abroad. He has been awarded research scholarships by Fundação Oriente (Lisbon); Charles Wallace Trust (United Kingdom), and University of Basel (Switzerland). Pinto is fluent in English, Konkani, Kannada, Tulu, Hindi, and can read/write but not speak Portuguese. He is also the managing trustee of Samanvaya Prakashan, Mangalore.

Works
English

Konkani

Kannada

Awards
Jnana Nidhi Puraskar (2000): Presented by Kerala State Konkani Catholics Prathistana, for scientific research work on the history of Konkani Christians of Coastal Karnataka.
Danti Memorial Award (2000): Presented by Catholic Sabha, Mangalore for the research work entitled Karavali Karnatakadalli Kraistara Ithihasa, 1500–1763 A.D. (1999)
Dr. T. M. A Pai Award (2001) for the best book in Konkani 2001 in Kannada Script presented by Dr T. M.A Pai Foundation Manipal, Udupi for Desaantar Thaun Bandhadek – Karavali Karnatakantle Konkani Kristanv (1999)

References

Writers from Mangalore
Mangaloreans
20th-century Indian Jesuits
Kannada-language writers
Konkani-language writers
1960 births
Living people
University of Mysore alumni
Karnatak University alumni
21st-century Indian Jesuits